HMS Acanthus was a Flower-class corvette of the Royal Navy.

Construction and design
Acanthus was one of ten Flower-class corvettes ordered on 21 September 1939, in the fourth of a series of orders. She was laid down at Ailsa Shipbuilding Company's Troon shipyard on 21 December 1939, was launched on 26 May 1941 and completed on 1 October 1941.

References

Flower-class corvettes of the Royal Navy
1941 ships